Crippsdale is a locality in Alberta, Canada.

M. J. Cripps, an early postmaster, gave the community his last name.

References 

Localities in Thorhild County